Southey Green may refer to:

Southey, South Yorkshire, England, including the suburb of Southey Green
Southey Green, Essex, hamlet in Essex, England